Oryza is a genus in the plant family Poaceae, of which Oryza sativa (cultivated rice) is a member. Oryza is a genus of 24 species, most of which are annual and some perennial grasses, which are found in tropical and swampy parts of Africa, Asia and Australia. Given its wide geographic range, there exists a substantial diversity of specialized metabolites (also called secondary metabolites) in the genus Oryza. Understanding this diversity can provide us solutions for mitigate crop losses due to disease and pest damage in rice, and boost agricultural production.

Anthocyanins and flavonols
 Cyanidin 3-O-glucoside (I): Produced by purple pigmented rice
 Malvidin:  Produced by purple pigmented rice
 Tricin
 Quercitin
 Kaempferol
 Apigenin

Carotenoids-
 β-carotene (provitamin A)
 Lutein
 zeaxanthin

Hydroxycinnamic acids

Alkaloids
 Benzoxazinoids
 Quinolone alkaloids

Phytoalexins
 Sakuranetin: Increases rapidly under biotic and abiotic stress stimula including UV and pathogen attack.
 Naringenin

Polyphenols

Phytosterols

Volatiles

Hormones
 Ethylene
 Salicylate
 Jasmonate
 Auxins
 Cytokinins
 Gibberelins
 Abscisic acids
 Brassinosteroids
 Strigolactones (e.g.: 2′-epi-5-deoxystrigol, which is produced under phosphorus-deficient conditions)

See also 
 Phytochemistry

References 

 

es:Metabolito secundario